Aberavon Town railway station was a railway station on the Rhondda and Swansea Bay line which ran in the Rhondda Valley and Swansea area on the Welsh coast in the county of Glamorgan. Opened as Aberavon the station's name was changed twice before the emerging as Aberavon Town in 1924.

History

The station was incorporated into the Great Western Railway during the Grouping of 1923, Passing on to the Western Region of British Railways on nationalisation in 1948, it was then closed by the British Transport Commission.

The site today
The station has been completely removed without a trace. The site has now been taken over by a Tesco and a canal on the right side.

References

  
  
 Aberavon Town station on navigable O. S. map

Former Great Western Railway stations
Disused railway stations in Neath Port Talbot
Railway stations in Great Britain opened in 1895
Railway stations in Great Britain closed in 1962
1895 establishments in Wales
1962 disestablishments in Wales